Roy Edward Campbell, Jr. (born November 19, 1947) is an African-American prelate of the Catholic Church who has been serving as an auxiliary bishop for the Archdiocese of Washington since 2017.

Biography

Priesthood 
Roy Campbell was born on November 19, 1947, in Pomonkey, Maryland. On May 26, 2007, he was ordained to the priesthood for the Archdiocese of Washington by Cardinal Donald Wuerl.  Materials published by the Archdiocese of Washington credit former Cardinal Theodore McCarrick with "guid[ing] Bishop Campbell through his discernment of his call to the holy priesthood."

Auxiliary Bishop of Washington 
Pope Francis appointed Campbell as an auxiliary bishop for the Archdiocese of Washington on March 8, 2017. On April 21, 2017, Campbell was consecrated as a bishop by Cardinal Wuerl. Campbell's episcopal coat of arms contains a lion derived from McCarrick's coat of arms  and a tower derived from Wuerl's coat of arms.

On March 21, 2019, Campbell was elected president of the National Black Catholic Congress (NBCC), succeeding Bishop John Ricard.

See also

 Catholic Church hierarchy
 Catholic Church in the United States
 Historical list of the Catholic bishops of the United States
 List of Catholic bishops of the United States
 Lists of patriarchs, archbishops, and bishops

References

External links
Roman Catholic Archdiocese of  Washington Official Site

Episcopal succession

1947 births
Living people
People from Charles County, Maryland
Roman Catholic Archdiocese of Washington
Catholics from Maryland
21st-century Roman Catholic bishops in the United States
African-American Roman Catholic bishops
Bishops appointed by Pope Francis